In music, a drum cadence or street beat is a work played exclusively by the percussion section of a modern marching band (see marching percussion). It is stylistically descended from early military marches, and related to military cadences, as both are a means of providing a beat while marching. Usually, each instrument will have a part that mimics a specific drum or drums on a drum set to create a sound similar to a drum beat.

According to Hiro Songsblog a drum cadence is "'a drumline piece played in a parading marching band between or in place of full-band pieces'. Cadences are also: 'a chant that is sung by military personnel while parading or marching'."

Cadences employ the four basic drum strokes and often directly include drum rudiments. They have a wide range of difficulty, from simple accent patterns to complex rhythms including hybrid rudiments, and are played by virtually every modern drum line. Cadences are important from a performance standpoint, as a good drum cadence can make the band stand out from the rest in competition. Field shows are often preceded by the band marching to the beat of the cadence.

Marching percussion generally consists of at least snare drums, tenor drums, cymbals, and bass drums, and may include timpani.

See also
Cadence (music)
Military drum
wikt:drum cadence

Sources

Further reading
Maroni, Joe (2008). The Drum Cadence Book. .

External links
"How to Write a Drum Cadence", wikiHow.com.

Drum and bugle corps
Drum patterns
Drum rudiments
Instrumentals
March music
Military traditions
Military music
Percussion performance techniques